Esturia was a 2,143 gross register ton oiler, built by Armstrong Whitworth & Company, Walker in 1910. She operated as an oil tanker for the Burmah Oil Company, before being chartered by the Royal Australian Navy on 11 September 1914, during the First World War, as an oiler and stores ship. After being dispatched to Port Said, Egypt with the destroyers, she was transferred to the Admiralty.

After serving with the Admiralty, she was sold in 1918 to Shell Tankers UK, who operated her until 1928 when she was sold to the Greek company Mavris Bros Piraeus and renamed Loukia.

Fate
Loukia was lost on 4 March 1937, during a storm, after hitting a mine off Cape San Sebastian, Catalonia, Spain, during the Spanish Civil War. Loukia exploded, killing 22 of the 23 crew.

Notes

References

1910 ships
Ships built on the River Tyne
Auxiliary ships of the Royal Australian Navy
Ships sunk by mines
Maritime incidents in 1937
Shipwrecks of the Spanish Civil War
Destroyer tenders of the Royal Australian Navy
Oil tankers